The Eastern Beskids or Eastern Beskyds are a geological group of mountain ranges of the Beskids, within the Outer Eastern Carpathians. As a continuation of the Central Beskids, this mountain range includes the far southeastern corner of Poland, the far eastern corner of Slovakia, and stretches southward through western parts of Ukraine, up to the border of Romania.

In Polish and Ukrainian terminology, the range is commonly called the "Eastern Beskids", while in Slovakia, the term Meadowed Mountains is also used. The scope of those terms varies in accordance to different traditions and classifications.

At the three-way border, portions of the Slovak Bukovec Mountains, the Polish Bieszczady Mountains, and the adjacent "Uzhanskyi National Nature Park" and Nadsianskyi Regional Landscape Park in Ukraine form the transnational East Carpathian Biosphere Reserve.

Subdivisions 

The Eastern Beskids are commonly divided into two parallel ridges: Wooded Beskids and Polonynian Beskids.

Wooded Beskids (PL: Beskidy Lesiste; UA: Лісисті Бескиди):
 Bieszczady Mountains (PL: Bieszczady; UK: Бещади) → c1
 Western Bieszczady (PL: Bieszczady Zachodnie; UA: Західні Бещади) mainly in Poland and Slovakia, including the Bukovec Mountains (SK: Bukovské vrchy)
 Eastern Bieszczady (PL: Bieszczady Wschodnie; UA: Східні Бещади), mainly in Ukraine
 Sanok-Turka Mountains (PL: Góry Sanocko-Turczańskie; UK: Верхньодністровські Бескиди / Verkhnodnistrovski Beskydy) → c3
 Skole Beskids (PL: Beskidy Skolskie; UA: Сколівські Бескиди) → c2
 Gorgany (PL: Gorgany; UA: Ґорґани) → c4
 Pokuttia-Bucovina Beskids (PL: Beskidy Pokucko-Bukowińskie; UA: Покутсько-Буковинські Карпати / Pokutsko-Bukovinski Karpaty) → c5

Polonynian Beskids (PL: Beskidy Połonińskie; UA: Полонинські Бескиди):
 Smooth Polonyna (PL: Połonina Równa; UK: Полонина Рівна) → c6
 Polonyna Borzhava (PL: Połonina Borżawska; UK: Полонина Боржава) → c7
 Polonyna Kuk (PL: Połonina Kuk; UK: Полонина Кук) → c8
 Red Polonyna (PL: Połonina Czerwona; UK: Полонина Красна)→ c9
 Svydovets (PL: Świdowiec; UK: Свидівець) → c10
 Chornohora (PL: Czarnohora; UK: Чорногора) → c11
 Hrynyavy Mountains (PL: Połoniny Hryniawskie; UK: Гриняви) → c12

See also

References

Sources

External links

 Encyclopedia of Ukraine: Inner Carpathian Valley
 Encyclopedia of Ukraine: Borzhava
 Encyclopedia of Ukraine: Krasna
 Encyclopedia of Ukraine: Svydivets
 Encyclopedia of Ukraine: Chornohora
 Carpathian Mountains: Division (map)

Mountain ranges of the Eastern Carpathians
Mountain ranges of Ukraine
Mountain ranges of Poland
Mountain ranges of Slovakia